Table tennis at the 1960 Summer Paralympics consisted of eleven events, six for men and five for women.

Medal table

Medal summary

Men's events

Women's events

References 

 

1960 Summer Paralympics events
1960
Paralympics